Colin Walshe is a Gaelic footballer who plays at senior level for the Monaghan county team. Walshe won Ulster championships in 2013 and 2015 with Monaghan. In 2013, he won an All Star at right corner-back.

Honours
 Ulster Senior Football Championship (2): 2013, 2015
 National Football League, Division 2 (1): 2014
 National Football League, Division 3 (1): 2013
 All Star : 2013
 Sigerson Cup : 1

References

1990 births
Living people
Gaelic football forwards
Monaghan inter-county Gaelic footballers